Frazar is a surname. Notable people with the surname include:

Harrison Frazar (born 1971), American golfer
Lether Frazar (1904–1960), American politician

See also
Frazer (name)